The Congressional Brazil Caucus is a bipartisan caucus of the United States House of Representatives, whose goal is to protect and preserve the U.S.'s relationship with Brazil, and increase the economic interaction between the two countries. Representative Jim Kolbe (R-AZ) founded the caucus in 1999 as a way to "improve dialogue and trade relations between the United States and Brazil."

The Caucus is traditionally co-chaired by two to four of its members. The chairpersons of the caucus of the current 116th Congress are Representatives Darin LaHood (R-IL) and Gregory Meeks (D-NY).

References

Caucuses of the United States Congress
Brazil–United States relations
United States friendship associations